Eric Leader Pedley (January 2, 1896 - May 9, 1986) was a champion polo player and mayor of Belvedere, California.

Biography
He was born on January 2, 1896, in Riverside, California to William Pedley and Elizabeth Barlow Massicks. Around 1923 he married Alejandra Elena Macondray. He died on May 9, 1986, in Belvedere, California.

He earned a 9-goal handicap rating in 1930.

References

1896 births
1986 deaths
International Polo Cup
Sportspeople from Riverside, California
American polo players
Mayors of places in California
People from Belvedere, California